Ray County is in Tehran province, Iran. The capital of the county is the city of Ray. At the 2006 census, the county's population was 292,016 in 71,711 households. The following census in 2011 counted 319,305 people in 85,445 households. At the 2016 census, the county's population was 349,700 in 96,996 households.

Note on spelling

According to the Iranian Chamber Society, the correct spelling of the city in both English and Persian is "Ray," (with an "a" vowel sound) though variations in spelling also exist. The city university also uses the spelling "Ray" ("Azad University, Shahr-e-Ray") as does the Encyclopædia Iranica published by Columbia University.

Administrative divisions

The population history and structural changes of Ray County's administrative divisions over three consecutive censuses are shown in the following table. The latest census shows five districts, nine rural districts, and three cities.

References

 

Counties of Tehran Province